"It’s Different for Girls" is a song by Joe Jackson appearing on his 1979 album, I'm the Man. The song has since become one of his most successful singles, notably being the highest charting Joe Jackson single in the UK. Covers have been recorded and released by several different artists.

In 2007, Freaky Trigger ranked the song at number 52 in its list of "The Top 100 Songs of All Time". Glide Magazine ranked it as Jackson's 5th best song.

Background
"It's Different for Girls" contained lyrics that feature Jackson "deliberately turn[ing] clichés on their head" in that, while originally sounding as if the song would suggest that the male protagonist was looking for sex and his female partner was looking for love, the opposite is revealed to be the case. Jackson later said on the song's lyrics:

Taken from the Gold-certified 1979 album I'm the Man, "It's Different for Girls" was Joe Jackson's biggest UK chart single, peaking at #5 in the UK Singles Chart and #101 in Billboard. The song was backed with another track from I'm the Man, "Friday," in Britain, but in America, a live cover of the Chuck Berry song "Come On" was used instead.

Record World called it " a power pop ballad with echoing
vocals and keyboards that carry Jackson's thoughtfully poignant message about male/female roles."

Other appearances
Apart from appearing as a single and on the album I'm the Man, "It's Different for Girls" has also appeared on other Joe Jackson albums. A live version appeared on Live 1980/86 in 1987, having been recorded on Jackson's Big World tour in 1986. A different live version appeared on the 2000 album Summer in the City: Live in New York.

A new studio recording of the song, as a duet with Joy Askew, was included on the 12-inch vinyl and CD formats of Jackson's 1991 single "Stranger than Fiction". On the Laughter and Lust tour in 1991, it was performed as a duet with Mindy Jostyn, and their performance of the song at Sydney was included on the 1992 release Laughter & Lust Live.

The original version of the song was also included on Jackson's 1990 compilation Stepping Out: The Very Best of Joe Jackson and again on the 1997 compilation This Is It! (The A&M Years 1979–1989). "Come On" was released as a bonus track on the 2001 reissue of I'm the Man - prior to this it had only been available on Propaganda, a 1979 A&M records sampler notable for live tracks from Joe Jackson and The Police.

Composition
The song opens with a simple repeated two-note pattern on guitar which is quickly joined by a pulse on bass and drums. The first section of the verse remains quiet, with these instruments and the singer's voice being the main components. In the second section of the verse the dynamics change, with two strident beats on the lyrics "She said", and then drop back down to a quieter chorus driven by a slow arpeggiated guitar pattern, over which the vocal floats in a more complex melody, before returning to the original two-note guitar and bass pulse of the introduction.

Unlike many of Jackson's later songs, he plays no instruments, keyboards being absent from the track.

Personnel
Joe Jackson – vocals
Gary Sanford – guitar
Graham Maby – bass, vocals
David Houghton – drums, vocals

Charts

Cover versions

Siskin version

"It's Different for Girls" was covered by English duo Siskin, as their debut single in 2008. It is the group's only cover version to date.

Personnel
Galen Ayers - guitar, vocals
Kirsty Newton - keyboards, bass, vocals

Other versions
The song was recorded by Farrah, and released as a track on their 2004 album Me Too.
In 2012, Joe Pernice recorded a version of the song for a fund raising CD titled Super Hits of the Seventies for radio station WFMU.
In 2019, Trevor Horn performed an orchestral arrangement of the song on his album Trevor Horn Reimagines the Eighties, featuring Marillions Steve Hogarth on lead vocals.
In January 2022, the Smile, comprising Radiohead members Thom Yorke and Jonny Greenwood and drummer Tom Skinner, performed the song at two of their debut shows in London.

References

Joe Jackson (musician) songs
A&M Records singles
1979 singles
2008 debut singles
Songs written by Joe Jackson (musician)
Song recordings produced by David Kershenbaum
1979 songs